The Benson Unified School District is the school district for the town of Benson, Arizona. It operates San Pedro Valley (alternative) and Benson high schools; a middle school; and a primary school.

References

External links
 

School districts in Cochise County, Arizona
Benson, Arizona